Rui Óscar Neves de Sousa Viana, known as Rui Óscar (born 17 December 1975) is a former Portuguese football player.

He played 10 seasons and 187 games in the Primeira Liga for Marítimo, Boavista, Leça, Beira-Mar and Porto.

Club career
He made his Primeira Liga debut for Leça on 20 August 1995 in a game against Gil Vicente.

Honours

Club
Boavista
Primeira Liga: 2000–01

International
Portugal Under-18
UEFA European Under-18 Championship: 1994

References

External links
 

1975 births
People from Gondomar, Portugal
Living people
Portuguese footballers
Portugal youth international footballers
Portugal under-21 international footballers
C.F. União de Lamas players
Liga Portugal 2 players
Leça F.C. players
Primeira Liga players
FC Porto players
C.S. Marítimo players
Boavista F.C. players
S.C. Beira-Mar players
Association football defenders
Portugal B international footballers
Sportspeople from Porto District